Isha Khan Choudhury is an Indian politician from the state of West Bengal.  He represented the Sujapur constituency in the West Bengal Legislative Assembly as a candidate of the Indian National Congress party. He comes from a political family with his father and uncle being former cabinet ministers in the central government.

Personal life 
Khan Choudhury spent the early years of his life in Canada. His Bengali Muslim father is Abu Hasem Khan Choudhury. He has two uncles , A.B.A. Ghani Khan Choudhury and Abu Nasar Khan Choudhury. His cousin Mausam Noor (daughter of Ghani Khan Choudhury's sister) is a Member of Indian Parliament. All of them are members of the Indian National Congress except Abu Nasar who defected to the Trinamool Congress party. The Khan Choudhury brothers are former cabinet ministers in the central government.

Political career 
In the 2011 West Bengal Assembly election, Khan Choudhury emerged victorious from the Baishnabnagar constituency as a candidate of the Indian National Congress party. In the election, he defeated a Hindu candidate fielded by the Communist Party of India (Marxist). In the 2016 West Bengal Assembly election, he contested from the Sujapur constituency. He said that he took this decision "on the direction of the party high command". He was pitted against his own uncle Abu Nasar who switched to the Trinamool Congress party. During his election campaign he said that his uncle did not work for the benefit of the citizens and hence claimed that they were therefore supporting the Congress party. In the election, he defeated his uncle after he secured 97 thousand votes compared to his uncle's 50 thousand votes.

References

Living people
West Bengal politicians
People from Malda district
Muslim politics in India
Indian National Congress politicians
1971 births
West Bengal MLAs 2016–2021
20th-century Bengalis
21st-century Bengalis